"The Moneymaker" is a song by American indie rock band Rilo Kiley. It was released on July 3, 2007, as the first single from the group's fourth album Under the Blacklight (2007). The lyrics are almost certainly about sex, if not prostitution or the adult industry, in keeping with the album's theme of showing the "sketchy side" of Los Angeles.

Music video
The music video for "The Moneymaker" opens with brief clips of interviews (apparently conducted by Jenny Lewis) with pornographic actors Tommy Gunn, Faye Runaway, and Hailey Young. Along with the band, these three are featured in the video, where they interact in what is best described as a sexually charged manner.

In popular culture
In 2009 American-based fast-food restaurant chain Carl's Jr. used the song in one of its commercials. The same year "The Moneymaker" was featured in an episode of 90210 TV series.

Track listing

References

External links
 

2007 singles
Rilo Kiley songs
2007 songs
Warner Records singles